Flood alerts are issued by weather agencies to alert residents that flood conditions are a possibility.

Types of flood alerts in the United States
In the United States, a flash flood watch is issued by the National Weather Service (NWS) when weather conditions are favorable for very heavy rain that could cause flooding or flash flooding. A watch does not mean that flooding is occurring, only that weather conditions have created or will create a significant risk for it. If flooding occurs, a flood warning or flash flood warning would be issued, and immediate action should be taken. A flood warning or flash flood warning is issued when flooding is imminent or already occurring. When flood warnings are issued, it means that area waterways will likely soon be in flood. Not all flood watches suggest that large-scale flooding, such as during landfalling tropical cyclones, is possible.

Flood alerts in other countries
In Canada, a heavy rainfall warning, which indicates rainfall amounts that could produce flooding are expected, has basically the same meaning as a flood watch.

In Australia, the Bureau of Meteorology issues a flood watch that covers similar conditions to Flood Watches in the United States. However, they are known by slightly different names in some areas.

In Europe, there is the European Flood Awareness System and the commercial product including app and data services FloodAlert.

See also
 Flood forecasting

References

Weather warnings and advisories
Flood control